Mustafa Kalemli (born March 26, 1943) is a Turkish physician and politician, who served as government minister and Speaker of the Turkish Grand National Assembly.

Early life and career
Mustafa Kalemli was born in Tavşanlı, Kütahya Province, Turkey.

Mustafa Kalemli went to the primary and secondary school in Tavşanlı, and finished the high school in Eskişehir. After graduating from the Faculty of Medicine at Ankara University in 1967, he was admitted as an assistant in the same university's Institute of Urology. In 1972, Kalemli became a specialist physician in urology. Between 1976 and 1978, he served in various positions at the Ministry of Health. In 1978, he conducted research work in the field of andrology and renal transplant at the Eppendorf Hospital of Hamburg University in then West Germany.

Mustafa Kalemli helped co-found the Akdeniz University in Antalya, and headed the Institut of Urology there after he became an associate professor at Ankara University in 1978.

Co-founding the Tavşanlı Social Security Hospital, he served as its chief physician. In 1983, Kalemli headed the urology clinic at the Buca Hospital.

Politics
Entered politics, he joined the newly established Motherland Party (ANAP). Kalemli was elected into the parliament as a deputy of Kütahya after the 1983 general elections held on November 6. He served between December 14, 1983 – October 17, 1986 as Minister of Labor and Social Security and between October 17, 1986 – December 21, 1987 as Minister of Health and Social Aid in the cabinet of Turgut Özal.

He was re-elected in the 1987 general elections held on October 29 for the second time as a deputy of Kütahya. He was appointed Minister of the Interior serving between December 22, 1987 – March 30, 1989.

In the cabinet of Mesut Yılmaz, he served a second time as the Minister of the Interior from June 24, 1991 until August 26, 1991, when he was appointed to the newly established Ministry of Forest. He served at this post until November 20, 1991.

Mustafa Kalemli was re-elected in the 1995 general elections held on December 24. On January 25, 1996, the parliament elected him speaker, a position he held until September 30, 1997.

Personal life
Mustafa Kalemli is married and has two daughters, including Şebnem Kalemli.

Honor
A hospital in Tavşanlı is named after him.

References

Living people
1943 births
People from Tavşanlı
Ankara University alumni
Turkish urologists
Academic staff of Ankara University
Academic staff of Akdeniz University
Motherland Party (Turkey) politicians
Government ministers of Turkey
Ministers of Labour and Social Security of Turkey
Health ministers of Turkey
Ministers of the Interior of Turkey
Speakers of the Parliament of Turkey
Deputies of Kütahya
Members of the 20th Parliament of Turkey
Members of the 48th government of Turkey
Deputy Speakers of the Grand National Assembly of Turkey
Academic staff of the University of Hamburg